Paide Parish was a rural municipality of Estonia, in Järva County. It had a population of 1935 (as of 2004) and an area of 300 km².

Nurmsi Airfield (ICAO: EENI) is located in the parish. During the Cold War, it hosted a front-line fighter air base "Koigi".

Villages
Anna - Eivere - Kirila - Korba - Kriilevälja - Mäeküla - Mäo - Mustla - Mustla-Nõmme - Mündi - Nurme - Nurmsi - Ojaküla - Otiku - Pikaküla - Prääma - Puiatu - Purdi - Sargvere - Seinapalu - Sillaotsa - Sõmeru - Suurpalu - Tarbja - Valgma - Veskiaru - Viraksaare - Võõbu.

Gallery

References